S.D. Curlee is a guitar manufacturer originating in Matteson, Illinois and presently in central Texas. Peak years were 1977 to 1981 before ceasing production until 2011. For a while its electric basses were popular, much more so than their guitars. They were exported and especially popular in Ecuador & Belgium Malaysia currents spotted and Germany during the original run.

History 
This company founded by musician/businessman Randy Curlee, instrument designer Randy Dritz and pattern maker Sonny Storbeck in 1975 in Matteson, IL. The name S.D Curlee came from the three original partners: Storbeck, Dritz and Curlee. Production began in early 1976 and ceased in 1982.  

Officially, the company manufactured around 15,000 instruments, though this is disputed amongst the company founders. Curlee wanted to offer a quality-built instrument at an affordable price. Advertising campaigns were focused on Guitar Player. An classy 8-page color brochure from 1979 was produced along with multiple color ads originally placed in the magazine.

During these years, the Curlee brand was applied to Curlee-arranged import versions and was also licensed to Hondo.  S.D. Curlee was one of the first instrument manufacturers to use this approach to address the issue of unlicensed copies of premium brands. Other instrument companies subsequently followed its lead, such as Fender's Squier brand of Asian-manufactured products and Gibson's use of its Epiphone brand. This business model has become a standard both to gain a share in the copy market and also provide customers with a more budget-oriented version of a higher-priced instrument.

During the early 1980s the climate for these 'all natural' instruments changed drastically. Headless designs, flashy colors and an altogether different approach inspired Curlee to branch out and offer flashy, painted guitars reminiscent of the original version. Combined with a recession and internal business decisions, the company ceased operations in 1982. Curlee's innovative designs inspired a cult following that remains active today.

Randy Curlee continued in sales and marketing in the musical instrument industry, including work for Yamaha as the manager of the DGA (Drums, Guitars & Amps) Division and Peavey Guitars.  He died in 2005 from complications of diabetes.

Construction 

The Curlee instruments featured a unique design blend of neck through body and a bolt-on neck, which was anchored in the body with a heavy brass plate.

Most of the 1970s bass models shared the same basic, almost symmetrical shape (inspired by the Gibson Les Paul Jr. double cutaway), and were available in fretted and fretless versions. The main models were:

 Standard 1 (1 P-bass DiMarzio, mahogany body, maple neck, originally equipped with a Gibson EB-like humbucker, the DiMarzio Model One, located near the bridge)
 Standard 2 (identical to the above but 2 pick ups - P pickup-era only)
 Butcher (body made of butcher block maple)
 Liberty (liberty bell shaped body designed by Denny Rauen)
 Curbeck (body made of walnut, maple stripes)
 Summit (body and neck made of laminated walnut and Maple)
 Yankee (active electronics, walnut body, maple neck, small upper horn/lower bout, ...sort of an 'updated'version of the Curbeck ) - released in the early 1980s. The Yankee was advertised with three different pick up configurations; 1 P-bass (Yankee I), 2-Pbass (Yankee II) and the rare Yankee II-J including 1 P-bass (bridge)/J-bass (neck). Most Yankees have a 2 p-bass pick-up set up (Yankee II).

Other models and body shapes were prototyped and saw limited production. Some late "Curlee" instruments (late in the original run the brand as applied had been modified, removing the S and D) had painted bodies and set (glued in) necks. A P-bass bodied version was produced along with pointy "Star" model basses & guitars, all in very limited batches. 

S.D. Curlees feature hardware including Grover tuning heads; brass, Badass II or original Badass bridges; a brass nut and high output DiMarzio pickups. All basses used a 32½" medium scale neck. Some of the original USA basses developed truss rod issues over time. Later models introduced a German Carve body edge and aluminum instead of brass plates.

Cultural effect and availability 

Although the brand enjoys a cult-like status, only a few famous bass guitarists were seen with Curlee models in the mid- to late-1970s. Former Mahavishnu Orchestra bass guitarist Rick Laird had one, R. "Skeet" Curtis played one (and still has it) while touring with Parliament, Vincent Gallo used one in the New York City noise band Gray and Nick Lowe used a Curlee fretless on a few assignments. Jack Blades used them on the first Night Ranger album and played one on the "Don't tell me you love me" video. Alec John Such (Bon Jovi) was known to have three. Recently, guitarist Adam McIlwee of Tigers Jaw can be seen using a vintage Curlee guitar. Brandt Huseman of The Greenberry Woods, plays a vintage international Standard 1 bass. Duran Duran bass player John Taylor posted the 1980 bill for his Hondo Curlee bass on the Duran Duran website.

On July 4, 2011 Scott Beckwith, owner of Birdsong Guitars, announced the resurrection of the SD Curlee instruments. The new basses are visually close to the originals but with modern hardware and upgrades. Current production is of USA basses only and is under 25 per year.

References

External links
SD Curlee website

Guitar manufacturing companies of the United States